Lower Shelton is a village in the civil parish of Marston Moreteyne  in Bedfordshire, England.
It is made of  Lower Shelton Road, Stratford Way, The Rickyard, Franklin Close and Chequers Close and another small close known locally as "The jetty" although there is no water in view. The area is made up of many sizes and types of houses of differing ages.

Shelton Manor is located halfway between the A421 and Upper Shelton and located close to the disused Shelton Farm.
The road is in a rural setting between fields with views of Lidlington and the ancient church of Marston Moreteyne. Near the top the road is crossed by a high voltage power line from Toddington switching station.

The last main housing estate to be built within the village was The Rickyard, which was completed in 2005.

References

External links

Villages in Bedfordshire
Central Bedfordshire District